Chris Rouleau, also known as Blaze Ya Dead Homie or simply Blaze (born April 27, 1976), is an American rapper from Mt. Clemens, Michigan. A representative of the hip hop subgenres gangsta rap and horrorcore, his stage persona is a resurrected gang member who had been killed in the late 1980s.

Biography

Pre-Psychopathic years (1993–1997)
Rouleau began rapping at the age of 17, while in Romeo High School, and performed at local clubs on the east side of Detroit. Rouleau performed as a member of 2 Krazy Devils (with Skrapz) under the stage name Psycho C. Rouleau's first big performance was at the Ritz in Roseville Michigan, where he and James Lowery opened for House of Krazees. House of Krazees member The R.O.C. later produced 2 Krazy Devils' only album, Flipped Insanity, before the group disbanded in 1996.

Psychopathic years (1998–2013)
Rouleau joined several groups, but no material was released. When Rouleau was about to give up rapping, he was encouraged to join Psychopathic Records, where he initially started out as a member of Insane Clown Posse's road crew. He appeared on Twiztid's Mostasteless album, and occasionally acted as a hype man in live concerts. Rouleau joined Dark Lotus and Psychopathic Rydas, performing in the latter under the stage name "Cell Block."

Blaze Ya Dead Homie EP  (2000)
In 2000, Rouleau released a solo EP, Blaze Ya Dead Homie, establishing his character as a gang member killed in the late 1980s. Rouleau toured major cities across the country to support the release, including a debut at the Gathering of the Juggalos. The album was released on Psychopathic Records and Phantom Zone Productions.

1 Less G n Da Hood  (2001–2003)
The LP 1 Less G n da Hood was recorded and released in 2001, followed by continued touring and appearances on several Psychopathic releases.

Colton Grundy: The Undying  (2004–2006)
On October 19, 2004, Rouleau released his second studio album, Colton Grundy: The Undying. It peaked at #9 on the Billboard Top Heatseekers chart, #16 on the Top Independent Albums chart, #57 on the Top R&B/Hip-Hop Albums chart, #167 on the Top Internet Albums chart, and #167 on the Billboard 200. Rouleau formed the group Drive-By with Lowery, releasing the album Pony Down (Prelude) in 2005. The following year, Rouleau contributed two tracks to the video game 25 To Life, which also featured music by Tupac Shakur, Public Enemy, DMX, Geto Boys and Tech N9ne.

Clockwork Gray  (2007–2009)
On August 21, 2007, Rouleau released his third studio album, Clockwork Gray. It peaked at #14 on the Top Independent Albums chart and at #34 on the Top R&B/Hip-Hop Albums chart. The album features Twiztid, The R.O.C., Boondox and Violent J. Twiztid, Blaze & The R.O.C. formed the group Samhein Witch Killaz. The song "Inside Looking Out" was a SWK song. Unfortunatally in 2011 the question was asked if there would ever be a SWK EP or full-length album, and it was confirmed that SWK would not be putting out any EP's or full-length albums. The R.O.C. & Blaze formed the group Zodiac MPrint, and the song "Ill Connect" was a Zodiac MPrint song. In late 2013 after Blaze left Psychopathic Records, he and The. R.O.C. started recording a new Zodiac MPrint cd, unknown if it's an EP or full-length album. On The R.O.C.'s Twitter account he announced that he has been bumping the rough cuts to the new Zodiac MPrint cd around October/November 2013. The name "Skywalkers" has been thrown around as the title for the cd, but in the "Clockwork Gray" pamphlet there was a promotional picture of Zodiac signs and the upcoming Zodiac cd to be called "Horrorscope".

Gang Rags  (2010–2013)
Rouleau's fourth studio album, Gang Rags, was released on June 22, 2010 and debuted number 52 on the Billboard 200. While on the 2011 Drive-By Tour, he released Gang Rags Extended Version (Uncut + Uncensored). Blaze would release the original version of Gang Rags on Drive-By's 2011 tour. Blaze released an EP on the "Kaos & Kronik Tour" with Twiztid, Kottonmouth Kings and Big B titled Blaze 'n' Bake EP.

Leaving Psychopathic & independent releases (2013)
Blaze released an EP single during the 2013 Drive-By Tour independently on his own label titled Grundy Entertainment. In March 2013, Joseph Bruce speculated that Blaze Ya Dead Homie had left the label. Blaze later spoke openly about the subject during a concert, stating that he had not departed from Psychopathic. ICP publicly apologized to Blaze via Twitter for the misunderstanding, but later confirmed during the Gathering of the Juggalos that Rouleau had indeed parted ways with Psychopathic. Later in 2013 Blaze did an interview with NE Hip Hop, saying that he had been hanging out with Strange Music in Kansas City, Missouri. He also went on to say that he wants to do some stuff with other artists he would like to work with, and also said that his fans will start seeing more of him after 2013.

Majik Ninja Entertainment years (2014–present)

Gang Rags: Reborn (2014–2015)
At the Days of Dead convention with Twiztid in early February 2014 it was announced that Blaze Ya Dead Homie had signed with Twiztid's new record label. In April 2014 it was announced on Twiztid's official Twitter account that Blaze's Gang Rags (Uncut & Uncensored) will be re-released in 2014 on Twiztid's new label. It was also announced that Blaze Ya Dead homie will be releasing two albums in 2014 if there are no major set backs. On July 19, 2014 Blaze Ya Dead Homie posted a picture on his official website showing that he will be releasing Gang Rags: Reborn sometime in late 2014. In early August 2014 on Blaze's official Instagram he posted a snippet of a new song on the album called "Fuck Shit Up". On August 22, 2014 on Blaze's official Facebook account, he released the official release date for Gang Rags: Reborn which is October 21, 2014. Also he released the official interview on his Facebook account. It was announced on September 12, 2014 by InGrooves that Twiztid's new label is called Majik Ninja Entertainment, and Gang Rags: Reborn's serial number will be MNE001. Gang Rags: Reborn charted at 106 on the billboard 200, starting Twiztid's new label off good.

Blaze will be going on MNEs label with PSY artist Boondox titled "Back From The Dead Tour" with special guest Trilogy. The tour kicks off February 14, 2015, which coincides with Twiztids 2nd annual "Be My Bloody Valentine Show", and concludes on March 11, 2015. It is also the first Majik Ninja/Psychopathic Tour, and the first Blaze/Boondox Tour since the "Stix & Headstones Tour" in 2011. Blaze and Boondox will also go on the second "Psychopathic/Majik Ninja" tour. The tour will take place from June 25–29, 2015 in Australia, with native rapper KidCrusher.

The Casket Factory (2015–2017)
In early 2015 Twiztid, Blaze Ya Dead Homie and The R.O.C. posted promotional pictures for Blaze's new album titled The Casket Factory. In a May 30, 2015 interview with The Underground in Australia, Blaze announced that he will be going on tour with Kottonmouth Kings in July, Drive-By may not put anything out in 2015, but possibly in 2016. He also stated that he and The R.O.C. have been working on their groups, Zodiac MPrint, debut album here and there, while each working on new solo material. He also stated, and emphasised that his new album will be released in 2015. He may not know the official date until after his tour with Kottonmouth Kings, but he is working on picking out what songs will make the album, and he continued to say that he tries to stick to the release date that is released, he also continued to say that the album will be released in 2015. In June 2015 Twiztid posted on their Instagram account that Blaze's new album was coming along nicely and near the finishing stages. On June 29, 2015 Blaze posted a picture saying that The Casket Factory release date was coming out soon, and that he was going back to "The Dojo" to record some more for the album. Blaze will be going on tour with KMK, from July 12, 2015 through August 5, 2015. Blaze announced in early July that the official release date will be announced at the GOTJ 2015. In mid 2015 Blaze posted on his social media accounts askings fans who they would like to see him collab with on his upcoming album. This will make the first Majik Ninja Entertainment album to feature another artist off the label. During Twiztid's and Blaze Ya Dead Homie's 2015 GOTJ seminar it was announced that The Casket Factory will be released on January 15, 2016. On August 18, 2015, Majik Ninja Entertainment released Blaze's first single off The Casket Factory via Soundcloud. The single is titled "Ghost" and features Kung Fu Vampire. A few days later the second single was released titled "Wormfood", on August 21, 2016. In December 2015 the track list for the album was released and features, Kung Fu Vampire, DJ Swamp, Anybody Killa, The R.O.C., Lex "The Hex" Master, Boondox, and Twiztid. On December 23, 2015 the third single and first music video was released for the track "They Call That Gangsta" featuring The R.O.C. and Lex "The Hex" Master.

On January 20, 2016 it was announced through Blaze's official Facebook page that Blaze Ya Dead Homie will be releasing another album "soon", and is the follow up EP to The Casket Factory titled, The Casket Maker EP. In late March/early April 2016 the fourth single and second music video for the song "Who U Looking 4?" featuring Boondox and Jamie Madrox was released. Around the same time it was announced that Zodiac MPrint will be releasing their debut album titled Ride The Stars EP on May 20, 2016. There are 3 preorder packages to order from, number one containing the retail version, number two containing the retail version and The R.O.C. version, and the third containing the retail version, The R.O.C. version, and an autographed 24x36 Zodiac MPrint poster. Zodiac MPrint will perform at the release party for Twiztid's "The Green Book" (rerelease), and will perform on Twiztid's "Spooktacular Horror Show Tour" with Twiztid, Mac Lethal, Zodiac MPrint, Lex "The Hex" Master, Dagda, Godz Of War. On July 10, 2016 it was announced that Blaze Ya Dead Homie will be a new album at the GOTJ 2016 titled: "Dead Vulture EP". On December 30, 2016 it was announced that Blaze Ya Dead Homie and Lex "The Hex" Master will join Boondox as he goes on tour in March (The Murder Tour) to promote his new album The Murder.

On January 1, 2017 Blaze Ya Dead Homie was invited to the Juggalo March On Washington. On January 4, 2017 via Majik Ninja Entertainment Facebook account, it was announced that no one from the label would take part in the March but will take part in the 2017 Juggalo Day Show: Tales From The Lotus Pod. During Twiztid's Psychomania Tour a "special CD" was being sold in the crowd at shows during the tour by Detroit rapper and former Native World Inc. (ABK's label) artist, now running his own label Grinch Muzik Inc. after leaving NWI in early 2017. The CD was revealed to be a 3-song EP from Triple Threat featuring 3 songs from the upcoming full-length album titled Triple Threat that was released on September 1, 2017. The full-length album is only available online at the labels store, twiztid-shop, and not in stores, (Best Buy, FYE etc.).

New Album (2017–present)
On November 22, 2017, it was announced by Monoxide Child that he had to get back to the booth to work on some new beats for Blaze's new upcoming album. It had been hinted that "[an] album he has wanted to do for a long time, may finally happen after nearly a decade", which has some wondering if it's the album Last House On Dead Street, that was mentioned in DJ Clay's song Kept Grindin, and was eventually scrapped for Gang Rags which became Gang Rags: Extended & Uncut), and it was also scrapped for the Psychopathic Records version of Gang Rags.

Style and influences
Rouleau is a representative of the hip hop subgenres gangsta rap and horrorcore. Rouleau's music strongly derives from late 1980s/early 1990s West Coast hip hop, and sometimes incorporates elements of rock music. Rouleau's influences include Insane Clown Posse.  Rouleau also enjoys the music of Kiss, Kanye West, Black Sabbath, Iron Maiden, Journey, Spice 1, Twiztid, Slick Rick, The Notorious B.I.G., LL Cool J, Run DMC, N.W.A and Ice-T.

Discography

1 Less G n da Hood (2001)
Colton Grundy: The Undying (2004) 
Clockwork Gray (2007) 
Gang Rags (2010)
Gang Rags: Reborn (2014) 
The Casket Factory (2016)
Cadaver (2020)

All Groups
2 Krazy Devils (1995—1996)
International Superstars Incorporated (1996—1997)
Dark Lotus (1998—2017)
Psychopathic Rydas (1999—2017); The Rydas (2020-present)
Drive-By (2001—2006; 2007—present)
Triple Threat (2005—present)
Samhein Witch Killaz (2006—2009)
Zodiac MPrint (2006—2009; 2012—present)

Supergroup membership
Psychopathic Rydas (1999—2017); The Rydas (2020-present)
Dark Lotus (2000—2017)
Drive-By (2001—2006; 2007—present)
Samhein Witch Killaz (2005—2009)
Triple Threat (2005—present)
Zodiac MPrint (2006—2009; 2012—present)

Filmography
A Family Underground (2008)
Big Money Rustlas (2010)
Over/Under [TV Movie, "Pilot" episode] (2013)

Awards and nominations 

!
|-
|align=center|2019
|Himself
|Detroit Music Award for Outstanding Rap Artist
|
|
|-

References

External links
Official website

Horrorcore artists
Majik Ninja Entertainment artists
Psychopathic Records artists
Underground rappers
Rappers from Michigan
People from Mount Clemens, Michigan
1976 births
Living people
Gangsta rappers
21st-century American rappers
Dark Lotus members
Psychopathic Rydas members